The Long Island Central Pine Barrens (also known as the Long Island Pine Barrens) is a large area of publicly protected pine barrens in Suffolk County, New York, on Long Island, covering more than .

The Barrens operates in a similar manner to Adirondack Park, with public lands managed by a mix of federal, state, county and local public land managers intermixed with private inholdings.

It is Long Island's largest natural area and its last remaining wilderness.  The region contains a remnant of the Atlantic coastal pine barrens ecoregion, whose forests might once have covered a quarter million acres (1,000 km²) on Long Island.

The Central Pine Barrens overlays and recharges a portion of a federally designated sole source aquifer for Long Island's drinking water.  All of Long Island's drinking water comes from ground water wells; none of the island's water comes from reservoirs. Almost all of the Peconic River and Carmans River (two of Long Island's four biggest rivers) as well as much of their watersheds are in the Barrens.

Two other large, contiguous examples of this ecosystem remain in the northeastern United States: including the Massachusetts Coastal Pine Barrens and the New Jersey Pine Barrens.

History
In the 1970s the State of New York began acquiring large parcels to create a greenbelt.  The federal government at Brookhaven National Laboratory transferred  in 1971 and RCA transferred  around Rocky Point in 1978 (for a cost of $1).

In 1984 the Pine Barrens Review Commission was created to review development in the region.  In 1986 the Suffolk County Open Space Program financed by a 0.25% sales tax was to result in 28 new Suffolk County Parks in the region totalling 

Despite the efforts development pressure continued and in 1989 the Long Island Pine Barrens Society filed a multibillion-dollar suit against Suffolk County, and the towns of Brookhaven, Riverhead and Southampton. The Society eventually lost its suit in the New York's highest court—the New York Court of Appeals—after winning in earlier courts.

In 1993 the New York State Legislature approved the Long Island Pine Barrens Protection Act to protect the region through the development and implementation of a comprehensive land use plan.  The act also created the Central Pine Barrens Joint Planning & Policy Commission to oversee the plan, and divided the area into two regions:

A core  area where no development is permitted at all. Seventy-five percent of the land in the core area is to be acquired. A provision of the law allows private ownership in the core area provided there is a transfer of development rights arrangement where the owner can build elsewhere by transferring ownership of the core lands to a government entity.
A Compatible Growth Area of  where limited, environmentally compatible development is allowed.

The initial towns were Brookhaven, Riverhead, and Southampton.

Wildfires

Sunrise Wildfire of 1995

In late August-early September 1995, a series of major brush fires swept through the pine barrens region.  The first major fire incident occurred in Rocky Point, but was extinguished within days of its outbreak.  A larger, more catastrophic fire erupted in the Westhampton area just shortly after the Rocky Point blaze was brought to an end.  The fire, aided by high winds and dry conditions, quickly spread, threatening area homes and businesses.  The fire was nicknamed the "Sunrise Wildfire", as it engulfed both sides of Sunrise Highway, the major highway connecting the Hamptons region with the rest of Long Island.  The fires closed down the highway and stopped railroad service, effectively cutting the Hamptons off from the rest of the island for days as firefighters from all over Long Island, the FDNY and Connecticut worked around the clock to battle the blaze.

By early September, the Sunrise Wildfire was extinguished, but the results of that fire, in addition to the Rocky Point fire, were disastrous: Approximately  had burned, numerous homes and small businesses suffered damage, and 400 people were forced to evacuate their homes.  The fire, which erupted during the peak of the Hamptons' tourist season, resulted in a considerable economic blow for the region.  However, the human toll was very light, a few firefighters suffered injuries, and nobody was killed in the event.

As of 2007, the region has mostly recovered from the damage it sustained, although some vegetation still bears the scars of the fire. Pine Barren ecosystems are highly adapted to fire and generally require periodic fires to maintain their unique vegetation and wildlife.

Brookhaven Blaze of 2012
By the end of the day, the fires were intense enough to cause a closure of parts of the Long Island Expressway. Parts of Riverhead were placed under mandatory evacuation.

Brush fire burned  of pine lands. About 600 firefighters from about 109 departments battled the fire with 30 brush trucks, 20 tankers, and 100 engines. Airdrops of water were made by a New York State Police helicopter.

Sister parks 
The Central Pine Barrens Commission and the Migliarino-San Rossore-Massaciuccoli (MSRM) Regional Park in Tuscany, Italy are "twin parks" under a New York State program which supports such programs with the goal of sharing knowledge and experience between the citizens of both regions.

See also

 Atlantic coastal pine barrens
 List of pine barrens
 Pine Barrens (New Jersey)

References

Further reading
 Murphy, Robert Cushman. Fish-Shape Paumanok: Nature and Man on Long Island
 Turner, John. Exploring the Other Island: A Seasonal Guide to Nature on Long Island

External links 
Central Pine Barrens Joint Planning & Policy Commission
The Long Island Pine Barrens Society
United States Fish and Wildlife Service: Significant Habitats and Habitat Complexes of the New York Bight Watershed – Long Island Pine Barrens

Forests of New York (state)
Temperate coniferous forests of the United States
Ecoregions of the United States
 
Protected areas of New York (state)
Protected areas of Suffolk County, New York
Nature reserves in New York (state)